Martha Teichner (born January 12, 1948) is an American television news correspondent, currently working with CBS News and a frequent contributor on CBS Sunday Morning.

Biography
Teichner was born in Traverse City, Michigan, on January 12, 1948. She was raised in nearby Leelanau County, until her father died. Her family then relocated to East Grand Rapids, and graduated from East Grand Rapids High School in 1965. She received her bachelor's degree in economics from Wellesley College in 1969 and  Graduate School of Business Administration at the University of Chicago. She began her career at CBS News and her first report was on November 8, 1977, with Walter Cronkite sitting at the anchor desk.

Teichner has been a correspondent for CBS Sunday Morning since December 1993. She has won 10 Emmy Awards and five James Beard Foundation Awards for her work.

In February 2021, Teichner published a book, When Harry Met Minnie, about her friendship with a cancer patient, a fellow dog owner.

Personal life
Teichner is single, never married, and resides in New York City.

References

External links
Martha Teichner official profile

Living people
American television reporters and correspondents
University of Chicago alumni
Wellesley College alumni
CBS News people
American women television journalists
1948 births